Jean-Baptiste Philippe Cannissié (19 January 1799, in Landau – 7 August 1877, in Lille) was a French architect and painter. He was architect to the city of Lille from 1849 to 1867, notably overseeing the restoration of the Église Saint-Maurice.

1799 births
1877 deaths
19th-century French painters
French male painters
19th-century French architects
Artists from Lille
19th-century French male artists
18th-century French male artists